Randee Heller (born Randee Antzis; June 10, 1947) is an American television and film actress known for playing Alice in the 1970s sitcom Soap – one of television's first lesbian characters  – as well as for portraying Lucille LaRusso in the films The Karate Kid and The Karate Kid Part III, and in the streaming series Cobra Kai; and Bert Cooper's and Don Draper's elderly secretary Ida Blankenship  in a recurring role on the series Mad Men.

Early life
Heller was born in Brooklyn, New York City, and grew up in West Hempstead, New York, on Long Island, of Russian Jewish heritage. After initially attending Emerson College in Boston, she returned to Long Island to graduate in 1969 from Adelphi University, where she studied theater.

Career
The summer after graduation, she was cast in an Off-Broadway production of Godspell. She went on to do the Broadway musical Grease, playing Rizzo. In 1978, Heller moved from New York to California to pursue screen work.

Her role as Alice, one of the television's first lesbian characters, on the TV series Soap received mixed reviews, with criticism primarily directed not at her acting but at the stereotyping of her character. The Boston Herald  said that the characterization shows how "the networks have generally depicted lesbians either as suicidal losers or sexual predators."  For example, it identifies Alice as "TV's first recurring lesbian character," noting that she "first tries to throw herself off a bridge, then falls for Jodie (Billy Crystal), a confused gay man, and finally runs off.". Ahead of filming, producers ordered Heller's newly permed hair straightened at the network's insistence. Of a later episode in which Alice introduces her girlfriend, Heller said, "I went to kiss her in rehearsals and they said, 'No no no … you can’t do that.' I said, 'But she’s my girlfriend!' 'No, no no no, we can’t do that, we just cannot do that.' So it was so careful, it was so delicate in those days that you couldn’t really do your thing. … They wanted me to be a heterosexual homosexual." Heller would appear as a lesbian character again in a 2010 episode of Grey's Anatomy "Almost Grown," playing the partner of a female patient with a brain tumor.

Film career
After leaving Soap, the actress gained the role of Lucille LaRusso, mother of Daniel LaRusso (Ralph Macchio), in the Karate Kid movie series, appearing in the first and, as a cameo, third installments, to positive notices from critics. Reviewer Gene Siskel of the Chicago Tribune noted her absence from the second film, "Heller's honest portrayal of a single parent trying to raise an adolescent was one of the genuine pleasures of the original film." Ralph Macchio also "argued for her [inclusion]. Those scenes with her were some of my favorites in the original – they had some real emotion – and I honestly don't know why she isn't there."  Heller was also the voice that says "Hey Rock, you're a bum" in the first Rocky movie.

Other films include Fast Break (1979), Bulworth (1998), Monster-in-Law (2005), and Crazylove (2005).

Television guest appearances
Heller had a starring role as Carol in the 1979 TV movie Can You Hear the Laughter? The Story of Freddie Prinze. She has made guest appearances in television series including Murder, She Wrote, Less Than Perfect, ALF, Nip/Tuck, Judging Amy, Felicity, the children's series Drake & Josh, Night Court, Fame, and The White Shadow. She was a regular on the one-season program Husbands, Wives & Lovers (1978).  Heller played leading roles in three short-lived sitcoms: Second Chance (1987), "Better Days (TV series)," and Mama Malone (1984). Her TV-movie appearances include Can You Hear the Laughter? The Story of Freddie Prinze and And Your Name is Jonah (both 1979). Heller had a recurring role in the fourth season (2010) of AMC's Mad Men as Bert Cooper's and Don Draper's elderly secretary Ida Blankenship. For this role she received an Emmy nomination for Outstanding Guest Actress in a Drama Series. Also, in the 2010s, she played the recurring role of Ryan's neighbor Margot on the American version of Wilfred

Since 2018, Heller has reprised the role of Lucille LaRusso in the streaming show Cobra Kai.

Stage career
Heller has appeared in such theater productions as Bermuda Avenue Triangle, The Tale of the Allergist's Wife, and Cabaret. Of her role in Cabaret, with one reviewer remarked that:

Heller also played the role of Barbra Streisand's mother in the stage performances of Streisand's Timeless concerts in 2000. She performed the role after having been diagnosed with breast cancer the year before and undergoing a double mastectomy and chemotherapy and radiation treatments.

Personal life
Heller has been in a long-term relationship with TV writer-producer and former mime Robert Griffard and has two daughters, Sloane and Cody.

Filmography

Film

Television

Additional credits

 Husbands and Wives ... as Rita Bell (1977)
 ...And Your Name is Jonah ... as Connie (1979)
 Can You Hear the Laughter? The Story of Freddie Prinze ... as Carol (1979)
 Obsessed with a Married Woman ... as Rita (1985)
 The Last Fling ... as Mimi (1987)
 Changes ... as Carol Kellerman (1991)

 Coma ... as Doug's Mother (2009)
 Haunted with a View ... unknown / unnamed role (2011)

 Grease ... as Betty Rizzo (replacement) (February 14, 1972 – April 13, 1980)
 Hurry Harry ... as Helena / writer / Native No. 4 / Not-So-Grand Lama / Gypsy (October 12, 1972 – October 13, 1972)

References

External links
 
 

1947 births
20th-century American actresses
21st-century American actresses
Actresses from New York City
American film actresses
American musical theatre actresses
American stage actresses
American television actresses
American people of Russian-Jewish descent
Jewish American actresses
Living people
People from Brooklyn
People from Long Island
21st-century American Jews